Euerythra trimaculata, the three-spotted specter, is a moth of the family Erebidae. It was described by Smith in 1888. It is found in the United States in central and southern Texas and the Florida Panhandle.

The wingspan is about 28 mm.

References

Phaegopterina
Moths described in 1888